Vinjanampadu is a village in Prakasam district of Andhra Pradesh, India. Yeddanapudi is the mandal for Vinjanampadu.

References

Villages in Prakasam district